So Why Not? is an album by pianist Buddy Montgomery featuring performances recorded in 1985 and released on the Landmark label.

Reception

Scott Yanow at Allmusic noted "There is a lot of variety on this outing by Buddy Montgomery. ... All in all, this is a well-conceived and consistently intriguing straight-ahead outing by the underrated Buddy Montgomery".

Track listing
All compositions by Buddy Montgomery except where noted
 "So Why Not?" – 4:42
 "Waterfall" – 7:58
 "My Sentiments Exactly" – 5:26
 "Summer Nights" – 5:07
 "My Little Brown Book" (Billy Strayhorn) – 7:02
 "Out of This World" (Harold Arlen, Johnny Mercer) – 5:54
 "If Ever I Would Leave You" (Frederick Loewe, Alan Jay Lerner) – 4:23	
 "My Funny Valentine" (Richard Rodgers, Lorenz Hart) – 4:56	
 "Budini" – 5:52

Personnel
Buddy Montgomery – piano, vibraphone, synthesizer
 Warren Gale – trumpet (tracks 1 & 4)
David "Fathead" Newman – tenor saxophone (tracks 1–4)
Jim Nichols – guitar (tracks 1 & 3)
Ron Carter – bass (tracks 5, 6 & 8)
Jeff Chambers – bass, electric bass (tracks 1–4 & 7)
Ralph Penland – drums
Orestes Vilató – percussion (track 8)
Willie Colón – congas (tracks 1–4 & 8)

References

Landmark Records albums
Buddy Montgomery albums
1988 albums
Albums produced by Orrin Keepnews